Pacheco Union School District is a public primary school district in Redding, California in the south side of the city. The district consists of two schools, Pacheco Elementary School, and Prairie Elementary School, serving about 615 pupils in Grades K to 8. The grades at Prairie are K-3, while Pacheco has grades 4–8. Both have a special needs classes.

References

External links 
Pacheco Union School District website
Pacheco Union Elementary. National Center for Education Statistics. Retrieved on 2008-02-01.

Redding, California
School districts in Shasta County, California